Jill Neimark is an American writer.

Neimark has written one adult novel, a thriller titled Bloodsong, which was published in both hardcover and paperback, chosen by Book of The Month Club, and translated into German, Italian, and Hebrew. She has also published numerous children's books: I Want Your Moo (which was written with psychologist Marcella Bakur Weiner and translated and published in Spanish and Chinese), Toodles & Teeny, The Hugging Tree (which has been featured in dozens of read-a-louds around the world), The Secret Spiral and The Golden Rectangle, among others. She co-authored, with bioethicist Stephen Post, Why Good Things Happen to Good People, which was translated and published in Japan, Brazil, Russia, Portugal, India, Sweden, and Taiwan.

Neimark has also been published in The New York Times, Discover Magazine, Scientific American, Science, The Atlantic Monthly, Aeon, Undark Magazine, Sapiens, NPR, Nautilus  and Psychology Today on topics ranging from biology and physics to the mind and the soul. She has written poetry and reviews for the Massachusetts Review, Borderlands, Cimarron Review, The Blue Nib, The Rumpus and The New York Quarterly. She was a contributing editor for Discover Magazine, and has published on subjects ranging from human evolution to curing HIV. Her April 2007 cover story in Discover Magazine, "Understanding Autism" won the 2007 award from the Autism Society of America.

Bibliography
 Ice Cream!, 1986, 64 pages, Hastings House Publishers, 
 The Nose Knows, 1990, Hastings House Publishers, 
 Bloodsong, 1993, 275 pages, Random House, 
 I Want Your Moo!: A Story for Children About Self-Esteem (Paperback), 1994, 32 pages, Magination Press,  (with Marcella Bakur Weiner, and Jairo Barragan)reissued 2010, (Hardcover and Paperback)
 Why Good Things Happen to Good People: The Exciting New Research That Proves the Link Between Doing Good and Living a Longer, Healthier, Happier Life by Stephen Post, Ph.D. and Jill Neimark, 2007, 294 pages, Broadway Books, 
 The Secret Spiral by Gillian Neimark, 2011, 210 pages, Aladdin, 
 The Golden Rectangle by Gillian Neimark, 2013, Aladdin, 
 Toodles & Teeny (Hardcover and Paperback), 2013, 32 pages, Magination Press, 
 The Hugging Tree (Hardcover and Paperback), 2015, 32 pages, Magination Press,

References

External links
 personal website

20th-century American novelists
21st-century American novelists
American children's writers
American women novelists
Living people
Year of birth missing (living people)
Jewish American writers
American women poets
American women children's writers
20th-century American women writers
21st-century American women writers
20th-century American poets
21st-century American poets
21st-century American Jews